Complement factor B is a protein that in humans is encoded by the CFB gene.

Function 

This gene encodes complement factor B, a component of the alternative pathway of complement activation. Factor B circulates in the blood as a single chain polypeptide. Upon activation of the alternative pathway, it is cleaved by complement factor D yielding the noncatalytic chain Ba and the catalytic subunit Bb. The active subunit Bb is a serine protease that associates with C3b to form the alternative pathway C3 convertase. Bb is involved in the proliferation of preactivated B lymphocytes, while Ba inhibits their proliferation. This gene localizes to the major histocompatibility complex (MHC class III) region on chromosome 6. This cluster includes several genes involved in regulation of the immune reaction. The polyadenylation site of this gene is 421 bp from the 5' end of the gene for complement component 2.

References

Further reading

External links 
  GeneReviews/NCBI/NIH/UW entry on Atypical Hemolytic-Uremic Syndrome
  OMIM entries on Atypical Hemolytic-Uremic Syndrome
 The MEROPS online database for peptidases and their inhibitors: S01.196
 
 

Complement system